Made In Mauritius  is a 2009 film directed by David Constantin.

Synopsis 
A village on the Island of Mauritius. Bissoon, a retired peasant, has a problem. This morning, for the first time in twenty years, the fuse to his old radio has blown. In the village shop, Ah-Yan is taken aback by the ancient device. Fuses such as these are no longer made, so Ah-Yan tries to convince Bissoon to buy a radio “made in China”. When the elderly man hesitates, unsure, Ah-Yan decides to explain the benefits of globalization.

External links 

2009 films
Mauritian short films